Nikola Miljenić (born 19 May 1998) is a Croatian swimmer. He competed in the men's 100 metre freestyle at the 2020 Summer Olympics.

References

External links
 
 Indiana Hoosiers bio
 USC Trojans bio 

1998 births
Living people
Croatian male freestyle swimmers
Olympic swimmers of Croatia
Swimmers at the 2020 Summer Olympics
Swimmers from Zagreb
Indiana Hoosiers men's swimmers
USC Trojans men's swimmers
21st-century Croatian people